Australian International School may refer to:
 Australian International School Beijing
 Australian International School Hong Kong
 Australian Independent School, Indonesia, formerly Australian International School, Indonesia. Name change was a government requirement.
 Australian International School, Malaysia
 Australian International School, Sharjah
 Australian International School Singapore
 Australian International School, Vietnam